× Epilaeliocattleya, abbreviated Eplc. in the horticultural trade, is the nothogenus consisting of all intergeneric orchid hybrids descended from at least one species in each of the parent genera (Epidendrum, Laelia and Cattleya), and from no other natural genera.

References

Orchid nothogenera
Laeliinae